Psytronik Software is a British software publisher started in 1993. The company publishes new games for retro gaming platforms; Commodore 64, Amstrad CPC, Commodore 16, Commodore Plus/4, VIC 20, but also some titles for Windows. Among the games are: Mayhem in Monsterland, Knight 'n' Grail and Maze of the Mummy.

References

External links
 Official Site

Video game companies of the United Kingdom
Video game companies established in 1993